Cerophytum pulsator is a species of rare click beetle in the family Cerophytidae. It is found in North America.

References

Further reading

 

Elateroidea
Articles created by Qbugbot
Beetles described in 1845